Yekkeh Tut or Yekeh Tut may refer to:
 Yekkeh Tut, Golestan
 Yekeh Tut, Mazandaran
 Yekkeh Tut, Razavi Khorasan